OPDC may refer to:

 Old Oak and Park Royal Development Corporation, a development corporation in London, England
 Oil Products Distribution Company, part of the Ministry of Oil in Iraq
 Office of the Public Sector Development Commission, governmental agency in Thailand